Robert Logan may refer to:

Politics
 Robert Logan (politician) (1863–1935), New Zealand runholder, local politician, military leader and administrator
 Robert Hart Logan (1772-1838), Canadian-born British politician
 Robert Henry Logan (1839–1900), American soldier and politician

Film
 Bob Logan (film director), American film director and writer
Robert Logan Jr. (born 1941), American actor

Sports
 Bob Logan (ice hockey) (born 1964), ice hockey player
 Bob Logan (baseball) (1910–1978), American baseball pitcher

Other
 Robert Logan (bishop), Irish Roman Catholic bishop
 Robert K. Logan (born 1939), Canadian academic and writer
 Robert Logan Sr. (1837–1919), New Zealand boat builder
 Robert Logan of Restalrig (c. 1555–1606), Scottish conspirator
 Robert Logan (naval architect) (1861–1918), Scottish naval architect